María del Mar Sánchez (born 25 December 1979) is a Spanish athlete. She competed in the women's pole vault at the 2000 Summer Olympics.

References

1979 births
Living people
Athletes (track and field) at the 2000 Summer Olympics
Spanish female pole vaulters
Olympic athletes of Spain
Place of birth missing (living people)